Jan Alston (born April 14, 1969) is a Canadian-Swiss ice hockey executive, coach and former professional ice hockey centre. He was granted Swiss citizenship in 2002.

He became sport director at Swiss side Lausanne HC in 2011.

Playing career 
A native of Granby, Alston skated at the QMAAA and QMJHL level in his home province of Quebec and then spent his entire pro career in Europe, suiting up in Italy, Germany and Switzerland.

He launched his professional career in Italy in 1990 at third-division side Eppan. Over the years, he would gradually work his way up the ladder and spend 12 years in one of the most competitive leagues in Europe, the Swiss National League A (NLA).

Until 1994, Alston mostly played in Italy and signed with EHC Biel of the NLA for the 1994-95 campaign. He quickly made his scoring presence felt in the Swiss top-flight, tallying 28 goals and 23 assists (36 games) for Biel. After one year each at fellow NLA teams HC Davos and HC La Chaux-de-Fonds, Alston headed to Germany, joining the Berlin Capitals of the country's top-tier division, Deutsche Eishockey Liga (DEL), for the 1997-98 season. He transferred from Berlin to Adler Mannheim after one year and helped the team win the German championship in his first season (1998–99). Alston led the DEL in scoring (55 games: 31 goals, 43 assists) the following year, en route to being named DEL Player of the Year. After winning a second German championship with Mannheim in 2000-01, he returned to Switzerland, signing with NLA team ZSC Lions. In nine years with the Lions, Alston played a crucial role in their run to the 2008 Swiss championship and in winning the Champions Hockey League in 2009. He had two more appearances in the NLA finals with ZSC and also served as an assistant captain for several years.

Alston spent the last season (2010–11) of his playing career at NLB side Lausanne HC, while also serving as playing assistant to head coach John Van Boxmeer.

Managing career 
In November 2011, Alston put pen to paper on a five-year deal as sport director at Lausanne HC of Switzerland. He signed a five-year contract extension in December 2015.

Career statistics

References

External links
 

1969 births
Adler Mannheim players
Berlin Capitals players
Brown Bears men's ice hockey players
Brunico SG players
Canadian ice hockey centres
Canadian expatriate ice hockey players in Italy
Canadian expatriate ice hockey players in Germany
Canadian expatriate ice hockey players in Switzerland
EHC Biel players
GCK Lions players
HC Davos players
HC Eppan Pirates players
HC La Chaux-de-Fonds players
HC Varese players
Ice hockey people from Quebec
Lausanne HC players
Living people
People from Granby, Quebec
Saint-Jean Castors players
Saint-Jean Lynx players
Wipptal Broncos players
ZSC Lions players